Sodnomyn Gombo (born 7 February 1946) is a Mongolian boxer. He competed at the 1972 Summer Olympics and the 1976 Summer Olympics.

References

1946 births
Living people
Mongolian male boxers
Olympic boxers of Mongolia
Boxers at the 1972 Summer Olympics
Boxers at the 1976 Summer Olympics
Place of birth missing (living people)
Asian Games medalists in boxing
Boxers at the 1974 Asian Games
Asian Games silver medalists for Mongolia
Medalists at the 1974 Asian Games
Light-welterweight boxers
21st-century Mongolian people
20th-century Mongolian people